Dayan may refer to:

People 
 Dayan (surname), Hebrew surname
 Moshe Dayan (1915–1981), Israeli military leader and politician

Given name 
 Dayan Deerh
 Dayán Díaz (born 1989), Colombian professional baseball pitcher
 Dayan Jayatilleka, (born 1956), leftist Sri Lankan academic, diplomat, writer and politician
 Dayan Khan, Mongol ruler of Dayan
 Dayan Khan (Khoshut), ruler of the Khoshut Khanate
 Dayan Rajapakse (born 1972), Sri Lankan physician, educator and businessman
 Dayan Téllez (born 2002), Mexican football goalkeeper
 Dayán Viciedo (born 1989), Cuban professional baseball infielder
 Dayan van der Westhuizen (born 1994), South African rugby union player

Places 
 Dayan, or Old Town of Lijiang, World Heritage Site in Yunnan, China
 Dayan, in Evenk Autonomous Banner, Inner Mongolia, China
 Dayan, Fenghua District, Ningbo, Zhejiang, China
 Dayan Township, in Jiangyou, Sichuan, China
 Dayan, Iran, a village in East Azerbaijan Province, Iran
 Dayan Lake, in Bayan-Ölgii, Mongolia
 Dayan Town (disambiguation)

Others
 Dayan (rabbinic judge), Jewish religious judge in a Beth din
 Dayan (witch), a witch or vengeful female spirit in Indian culture
 Northern Yuan dynasty, also Dayan in Mongolian
 Yuan dynasty, Dayan in Mongolian
 Dayan, a Rubik's Cube Company
 Dayan, the smaller drum of the tabla set

See also
Dayana
Dayyán

Unisex given names